Abdulaziz Waseli  [عبدالعزيز واصلى in Arabic] (born 23 April 1996) is a Saudi football player who plays as a defender.

References

 

1996 births
Living people
Place of birth missing (living people)
Association football defenders
Saudi Arabian footballers
Ettifaq FC players
Al-Nojoom FC players
Al-Sahel SC (Saudi Arabia) players
Mudhar Club players
Saudi Professional League players
Saudi First Division League players
Saudi Second Division players
Saudi Third Division players